The Curtiss Fledgling, known internally to Curtiss as the Model 48 and Model 51 was a trainer aircraft developed for the United States Navy in the late 1920s and known in that service as the N2C.

Design and development
The Fledgling was designed in response to a 1927 Navy requirement for a new primary trainer, and was selected after evaluation in competition with fourteen other submissions. The Fledgling was a conventional biplane design with two-bay, staggered wings of equal span braced with N-struts. The pilot and instructor sat in tandem, open cockpits, and the fixed tailskid undercarriage could be easily swapped for a large central pontoon and outrigger floats under the wings for seaplane training. The Navy ordered two batches of the Fledgling, each powered by different versions of the Wright Whirlwind engine, both of which were built under the Curtiss designation Model 48.

Believing the design to have commercial potential, Curtiss developed the Model 51 as a civil equivalent powered by the less powerful Curtiss Challenger engine. The company operated 109 of these aircraft in its own air taxi service, the Curtiss Flying Service during the 1930s. A number of these aircraft were experimentally fitted with the same Wright engines used in their military counterparts as the J-1 and J-2, but these were not produced in quantity. Another experimental variant, the reduced-wingspan Fledgling Junior was produced to the extent of a single prototype only. A number of Model 51s were exported to foreign military services for evaluation: four to Canada and one to Czechoslovakia, but these did not lead to any purchases. Curtiss also delivered at least seven N2C-1 kits to Turkey in 1933, as part of an agreement to produce the Curtiss Hawk Model 35 under licence in Turkey. These N2C-1s were used as trainers and liaison aircraft by the Turkish Air Force until 1945. At least one N2C-1 is thought to have been given to Iran as a gift from the Turkish Air Force.

Variants

Model 48'''
XN2C-1Navy prototypes (3 built)
N2C-1Navy version powered by Wright J-5 Whirlwind (31 built)
N2C-2Navy version powered by Wright J-6-7 Whirlwind (20 built)
Model 51
Fledglingcommercial version with Curtiss Challenger engine (109 built)
J-1commercial version with Wright J-6-5 Whirlwind engine (four converted)
J-2commercial version with Wright J-6-7 Whirlwind engine built to N2C-2 standard (two converted)
Fledgling Juniorreduced wingspan version (one built)
Fledgling Guardsmanconvertible civil-military challenger powered versions.
A-3designation assigned by the United States Army Air Corp USAAC for use of the Fledgling as a radio-controlled target aircraft

Operators
Argentina (2 aviones en la Aviación Militar)

Brazilian Army

Four aircraft.

Colombian Air Force

One aircraft only.

Imperial Iranian Air Force

Turkish Air Force

Curtiss Flying Service
United States Navy
United States Army

Survivors
Museu Aeroespacial in Rio de Janeiro, Brazil
C/N B-51  Evergreen Aviation & Space Museum in McMinnville, Oregon
Old Rhinebeck Aerodrome in Red Hook, New York

Specifications (N2C-1)

References

Bibliography

Further reading

External links

 Old Rhinebeck Aerodrome's Curtiss Fledgling page 

1920s United States military trainer aircraft
Fledgling
Single-engined tractor aircraft
Biplanes
Aircraft first flown in 1927